Bror Svante Olsson (May 20, 1893 – April 8, 1955) was a Swedish track and field athlete who competed in the 1912 Summer Olympics. In 1912 he finished 13th in the javelin throw competition.

References

External links
Profile

1893 births
1955 deaths
Swedish male javelin throwers
Olympic athletes of Sweden
Athletes (track and field) at the 1912 Summer Olympics